Ravi Mama is a 1999 Indian Kannada-language romance drama film directed by S. Narayan and produced by S. K. Raju. The film stars V. Ravichandran  and Nagma. The film is a remake of the Tamil film En Thangachi Padichava.

The film released on 19 March 1999 across Karnataka cinema halls and was received well, while soundtrack and score by Chaitanya (L. N. Shastry) was received well.

Cast 
 V. Ravichandran as Ravi
 Nagma 
 Hema Panchamukhi
 Lokesh
 Doddanna
 Vijay Kashi
 Thiagarajan
 M. N. Lakshmi Devi

Soundtrack 
All the songs were composed by Chaitanya and written by S. Narayan.

Critical reception 

S Shiva Kumar from The Times of India wrote "The performances are good,especially by Dhodanna and Henma.Thyagarajan underplay and is menacing.Ravichandran and Nagma don't have much emoting to do. It would help if the length is pruned. Ultimately,there is more bevu in Ravimama Then bella". Srikanth Srinivasa from Deccan Herald wrote "S Narayan has failed as a director to get his team to work according to his directions. Seetharam as the cameraman is good in parts. Chaitanya, alias Shastry, shows promise as a budding music director. Otherwise, a complete waste of money and effort!".

References

External links 

 Thyview Ravimama

1999 films
1990s Kannada-language films
Indian romantic musical films
Kannada remakes of Tamil films
Films directed by S. Narayan
1990s romantic musical films